Ardalan Shekarabi (born 28 November 1978) is a Swedish politician and former party chairman. He was appointed Minister for Social Security in October 2019, and had previously served as Minister for Public Administration from 2014 to 2019. On 21 January 2019 he became Minister for Consumer Affairs.

Early life and education 
Ardalan Shekarabi is the son of Hassan Shekarabi and Sahra Sajadi. He was born in Manchester in the UK  and grew up in Shahriyar outside Tehran in Iran. Shekarabi came to Sweden in 1989 together with his mother as a political refugee from Iran. Together they got an apartment in Gävle and Shekarabi started in a preparatory class at primary school. After receiving a rejection decision on their asylum application to stay in Sweden, the family opposed the decision by hiding from the Swedish authorities. In 1991, they were granted a residence permit for humanitarian reasons.

In 2007, Ardalan graduated from Uppsala University with Master of Laws degree.

Controversies 
In December 2004 Dagens Nyheter revealed that Shekarabi had siphoned funds from his political party's youth fund SSU into an account supposed to be used for integration projects. This account was later used for private purchases. Shekarabi claims he did not know where the money came from.

During Shekarabi's leadership of the SSU it was also revealed that extensive membership cheating had occurred, inflating numbers to gain more funds for SSU.

References

1978 births
Living people
British emigrants to Sweden
Politicians from Manchester
Swedish Ministers for Social Security
Swedish people of Iranian descent
Swedish politicians of Iranian descent
Members of the Riksdag from the Social Democrats
Members of the Riksdag 2010–2014
Members of the Riksdag 2014–2018
Members of the Riksdag 2018–2022
Members of the Riksdag 2022–2026
Swedish politicians of Kurdish descent